Stefan Edberg was the defending champion but lost in the semifinals to Shuzo Matsuoka.

Wayne Ferreira won in the final 6–3, 6–4 against Matsuoka.

Seeds
The top eight seeds received a bye to the second round.

  Stefan Edberg (semifinals)
  Pete Sampras (quarterfinals)
  Boris Becker (second round)
  Guy Forget (second round)
  Goran Ivanišević (third round)
  Ivan Lendl (second round)
  Brad Gilbert (semifinals)
  Jakob Hlasek (second round)
  David Wheaton (third round)
  Amos Mansdorf (third round)
  MaliVai Washington (second round)
  Wayne Ferreira (champion)
  Arnaud Boetsch (second round)
  Todd Woodbridge (second round)
  Gianluca Pozzi (third round)
  Anders Järryd (first round)

Draw

Finals

Top half

Section 1

Section 2

Bottom half

Section 3

Section 4

External links
 1992 Stella Artois Championships draw

Singles